The Minnesota Fighting Pike were an Arena football team based in Minneapolis, Minnesota. They joined the Arena Football League (AFL) in 1996 as an expansion team. The Fighting Pike were the first ever attempt at an arena/indoor football team in the state of Minnesota. The owner of the Fighting Pike was Tom Scallen. The Fighting Pike played at the Target Center in Minneapolis, Minnesota. The team colors were green and gold. In a 2012 AFL Poll, the Fighting Pike were voted as the 8th greatest nickname in AFL history.

Franchise history
In November 1995, the announced that they would be nicknamed the "Fighting Pike" and that Art Haege was named the team's head coach.

During the team's first tryout, Haege walked out, stating he was going "Back to Iowa." The next day, Haege faxed in his resignation to team owner Tom Scallen.

The Pike were 0-7 at home, and the average attendance for the seven home games was 8,894.

The roster was full of players who had played at the University of Minnesota or other Minnesota colleges and universities. Tony Levine, a former Golden Gopher, joined the team and received 8 passes for a total of 83 yards and 1 touchdown. Former Gopher Rickey Foggie was the quarterback and he struggled adapting to the Arena Football League after many years in the Canadian Football League. Once during the season he was benched in favor of Southwest State's Jeff Loots, who threw four interceptions in a game. Loots was playing on his third expansion team in three seasons. Another player from Southwest State was Alvin Ashley. The best-known ex-Pike is kicker Mike Vanderjagt, later a star in the CFL and NFL.

Ray Jauch was the head coach. He was assisted by John Coatta Jr. on offense and Frank Haege on defense.

The team's lack of exposure or advertising was the key reason for the team's folding at the end of the 1996 season. The team did not have a regional television deal to promote their games or have the games advertised in newspapers and other media.

The Pike's final game of the season against the Memphis Pharaohs was played in Tupelo, Mississippi, because the Pharaohs had been evicted from their arena.

The Pike's official mascot was a giant Pike named "Tackle."  He was known to "dive" into a promotional hot tub at the arena.

Players

Final roster

Coaches

Head coaches

Coaching staff

1996 season results

Statistics

Team leaders
 Leading rusher: Harry Jackson 22 carries, 26 yards and 0 touchdowns
 Leading passer: Rickey Foggie 224-443  for 2,269 yards, 40 touchdowns and 16 interceptions.
 Leading receiver: Reggie Brown 79 catches, 964 yards 17, touchdowns

Offense

Passing

Rushing

Receiving

Touchdowns

Defense

Special teams

Kick return

Kicking

1996 regular season

Week 1: vs Texas Terror

at The Summit, Houston, Texas

Attendance: 4,520

Week 2: vs Iowa Barnstormers
at the Target Center, Minneapolis, Minnesota

Attendance: 14,840

Week 3: vs St. Louis Stampede
at the Target Center, Minneapolis, Minnesota

Attendance: 8,726

Week 4: vs Albany Firebirds
at the Times Union Center, Albany, New York

Attendance: 11,712

Week 5: vs Tampa Bay Storm
at the Target Center, Minneapolis, Minnesota

Attendance: 7,781

Week 6: vs Anaheim Piranhas
at the Target Center, Minneapolis, Minnesota

Attendance: 8,117

Week 7: vs Arizona Rattlers
at the Target Center, Minneapolis, Minnesota

Attendance: 8,207

Week 8: vs Florida Bobcats
at the West Palm Beach Auditorium, West Palm Beach, Florida

Attendance: 4,450

Week 10: vs Milwaukee Mustangs
at the Target Center, Minneapolis, Minnesota

Attendance: 7,207

Week 11: vs Connecticut Coyotes
at the Hartford Civic Center, Hartford, Connecticut

Attendance: 9,249

Week 12: vs Orlando Predators
at the Amway Arena, Orlando, Florida

Attendance: 15,107

Week 13: vs Texas Terror
at the Target Center, Minneapolis, Minnesota

Attendance: 7,380

Week 14: vs San Jose SaberCats
at the HP Pavilion, San Jose, California

Attendance: 14,901

Week 15: vs Memphis Pharaohs
at the BancorpSouth Arena, Tupelo, Mississippi

Attendance: 4,520

Other media
 The team appeared on the game EA Sports Arena Football as a hidden bonus team.

Notes
All game scores and statistics are from arenafan.com

External links
 Minnesota Fighting Pike at ArenaFan.com
 Minnesota Fighting Pike statistics

 
American football teams established in 1996
Sports clubs disestablished in 1996
1996 establishments in Minnesota
American football teams in Minnesota
1996 disestablishments in Minnesota
American football teams in Minneapolis–Saint Paul
1996 in sports in Minnesota
1990s in Minneapolis